A tolerated illness is a "noted discordance between subjective and objective health measures" in a patient.

Native American communities have been shown to have a high incidence of illness tolerance, in part because of the treatment they receive in the healthcare system. In psychopathology, distress tolerance describes "perceived capacity to withstand negative emotional and/or other aversive states".

In nature, the immune system of plants has been shown to protect against pathogens through a strategy of tolerance. This defense "decreases the host susceptibility to tissue damage, or other fitness costs, caused by the pathogens or by the immune response against them".

References 

Health care
Quality of life
Determinants of health
Plant immunity